The Spanish film industry produced over two hundred feature films in 2014. This article fully lists all non-pornographic films, including short films, that had a release date in that year and which were at least partly made by the Spain. It does not include films first released in previous years that had release dates in 2014.  Also included is an overview of the major events in Spanish film, including film festivals and awards ceremonies, as well as lists of those films that have been particularly well received, both critically and financially.

Major Releases

Notable Deaths

See also

 2014 in film
 2014 in Spain
 2014 in Spanish television
 Cinema of Spain
 List of 2014 box office number-one films in Spain
 List of Spanish submissions for the Academy Award for Best Foreign Language Film

References

External links
 Spanish films of 2014 at the Internet Movie Database

Spanish
2014
Films